Landa is a rural locality (a selo) and the administrative center of Shidibsky Selsoviet, Tlyaratinsky District, Republic of Dagestan, Russia. The population was 557 as of 2010. There are 4 streets.

Geography 
Landa is located 20 km northwest of Tlyarata (the district's administrative centre) by road. Khintida is the nearest rural locality.

References 

Rural localities in Tlyaratinsky District